From 2006 to 2008, NBC's studio show originally broadcast out of the rink at New York's Rockefeller Center, at the foot of NBC's offices during January and February. This allowed the on-air talent, including commentators for NHL on NBC, and their guests (often ex-players and youth hockey teams) to demonstrate plays and hockey skills. From April onwards, and during inclement weather, the studio show moved to Studio 8G inside the GE Building, where NBC produces its Football Night in America program. For the Stanley Cup Finals, the show was usually broadcast on location.

Beginning in 2008, the studio show originates from the game venue. In 2012, the studio show moved to NBC Sports’ new headquarters in Stamford, Connecticut. The studio show now usually goes on the road for special events like: the Winter Classic, All-Star Weekend, the Stadium Series, and the Stanley Cup Finals.

List of personalities

Full-time

Kenny Albert: play-by-play (2011–2015); #2 play-by-play (2015–2020); Lead play-by-play (2021); now lead play-by-play announcer for TNT, 98.7 ESPN/WEPN 1050 (New York Rangers radio broadcasts), Fox NFL, and New York Knicks on MSG Network.
Mike Emrick: lead play-by-play (2006–2020); contributor (2021)
Eddie Olczyk: studio analyst (2006); lead color commentator (2007–2021); now co-lead color commentator for Root Sports Northwest (Seattle Kraken broadcasts) and lead color commentator for TNT
Pierre McGuire: "Inside the Glass" reporter (2006–2021), studio host/analyst (2008–2011); former lead color commentator for TSN Hockey
John Forslund: play-by-play (2011–2021); now play-by-play for Root Sports Northwest (Seattle Kraken broadcasts) and TNT
Brian Boucher: "Inside the Glass" reporter/studio analyst (2015–2021), lead "Inside the Glass" reporter (2019–2021); now color commentator for ESPN/ABC and fill-in color commentator for NBC Sports Philadelphia (Philadelphia Flyers broadcasts)
Liam McHugh: lead studio host (2011–2021); also lead on-site host for Football Night in America (2017–2020); now lead studio host for TNT
Keith Jones: lead studio analyst (2011–2021); now color commentator for NBC Sports Philadelphia (Philadelphia Flyers broadcasts) and lead "Inside the Glass" reporter for TNT
Kathryn Tappen: studio host and reporter  (2014–2021)
Patrick Sharp: studio analyst (2019–2021)
Anson Carter: studio analyst (2012–2021); "Inside the Glass" reporter (2015); now studio analyst for TNT
Darren Dreger: NHL insider (2014–2021); also insider for TSN Hockey
Bob McKenzie: NHL insider (2014–2021); also insider for TSN Hockey

Part-time
Mike Babcock: guest studio analyst (2021)
Brendan Burke: play-by-play (2017–2021); now play-by-play for MSG Network/MSG Plus (New York Islanders broadcasts) and TNT
Ryan Callahan: guest studio analyst (2020–2021); now color commentator and studio analyst on ESPN
Brian Engblom: Former #2 color commentator (2011–2015); part-time (2015–2020); also color commentator for Bally Sports Sun (Tampa Bay Lightning broadcasts)
Ahmed Fareed: fill-in studio host (2019–2021)
Ray Ferraro: studio analyst (2006–2007); "Inside the Glass" reporter (2015–2021); now lead color commentator for TSN Hockey and ESPN/ABC
Scott Hartnell: guest studio analyst (2020); also back-up color commentator for NBC Sports Philadelphia (Philadelphia Flyers broadcasts)
Bret Hedican: "Inside the Glass" reporter (2011–2021); now color commentator for NBC Sports California (San Jose Sharks broadcasts) and TNT
Mike Johnson: color commentator/studio analyst (2017–2021); also color commentator for TSN Hockey
Ben Lovejoy: guest studio analyst (2020–2021)
Joe Micheletti: "Inside the Glass" reporter (2007, 2011–2021), color commentator (2014–2021); also color commentator MSG Network (New York Rangers broadcasts)
Gord Miller: play-by-play (2011–2021); now play-by-play for TSN Hockey and ESPN
A. J. Mleczko: color commentator (2018–2021); now color commentator and studio analyst for MSG Plus (New York Islanders broadcasts) and ESPN/ABC
Dominic Moore: guest studio analyst and color commentator (2020–2021); now color commentator and studio analyst for ESPN
Kendall Coyne Schofield: color commentator (2019–2021); also playing for the United States women's national ice hockey team
Mike Tirico: Stanley Cup Finals game host and interviewer (2018–2019); studio host/play-by-play (2019–2021)

NBC Sports Regional Networks personalities
NBC Sports Regional Networks personnel may occasionally appear on NBCSN broadcasts during the latter part of the season and the first round of the Stanley Cup playoffs.

NBC Sports California
Randy Hahn: play-by-play (2011–present); also lead play-by-play for exclusive Sharks national regular season broadcasts
Bret Hedican: color commentator (2014–present)
Jamie Baker: color commentator (2014–2020)
Drew Remenda: color commentator for NBC Sports California simulcasts (2011–2014); fill-in color commentator (2021–present)

Both Hahn and Hedican fill-in on games broadcast on TNT

NBC Sports Chicago
Pat Foley: play-by-play (2011–2022)
Chris Vosters: play-by-play (2022–present)
Eddie Olczyk: primary color commentator (2011–2022); also lead color commentator for NHL on TNT
Steve Konroyd: substitute color commentator (2011–2021)
Colby Cohen: substitute color commentator (2022–present)
Caley Chelios: substitute color commentator (2022–present)
Nick Olczyk: substitute color commentator (2022)
Troy Murray: co-lead color commentator (2022–present)
Patrick Sharp: co-lead color commentator (2022–present)

NBC Sports Washington
Joe Beninati: play-by-play (2011–present)
Craig Laughlin: color commentator (2011–present)
Alan May: "Inside the Glass" reporter (2011–present)

NBC Sports Philadelphia
Jim Jackson: play-by-play (2011–present)
Keith Jones: primary color commentator (2011–present); also lead Inside the Glass reporter for NHL on TNT
Scott Hartnell: fill-in color commentator (2021–present)
Brian Boucher: fill-in color commentator (2021–present); also lead Inside the Glass reporter for ESPN/ ABC

Jackson fills-in on games broadcast on TNT

Other on-air staff (occasional appearances)
Andy Brickley: "Inside the Glass" reporter; also lead color commentator for NESN (Boston Bruins broadcasts)
Ken Daniels: play-by-play; also lead play-by-play for Fox Sports Detroit (Detroit Red Wings broadcasts)
Alex Faust: play-by-play; also play-by-play for Fox Sports West and Prime Ticket (Los Angeles Kings broadcasts)
Jim Fox: color commentator; also color commentator for Fox Sports West and Prime Ticket (Los Angeles Kings broadcasts)
Butch Goring: color commentator; also color commentator for MSG Network/MSG Plus (New York Islanders broadcasts)
Darren Pang: "Inside the Glass" reporter (2007–2021), NHL Winter Classic reporter (2008–2012); also lead color commentator for Fox Sports Midwest (St. Louis Blues broadcasts) and #2 color commentator for TNT
Brian Hayward: "Inside the Glass" reporter; also color commentator for Fox Sports West and Prime Ticket (Anaheim Ducks broadcasts)
Mike Keenan: studio analyst
Peter McNab: color commentator; also color commentator for Altitude Sports (Colorado Avalanche broadcasts)
Daryl Reaugh: color commentator; also lead color commentator (2011–2017, 2018–present), play-by-play (2017–2018) for both TV and radio Dallas Stars broadcasts
Rob Simmelkjaer: studio host
Tripp Tracy: "Inside the Glass" reporter; also color commentator for Fox Sports Carolinas (Carolina Hurricanes broadcasts)
John Walton: play-by-play; also play-by-play for Washington Capitals radio broadcasts
Dave Goucher: play-by-play; also lead play-by-play for AT&T SportsNet Rocky Mountain (Vegas Golden Knights broadcasts)
Shane Hnidy: color commentator; also lead color commentator for AT&T SportsNet Rocky Mountain (Vegas Golden Knights broadcasts)

Former
Jamie Baker: color commentator (2014–2020)
Dave Briggs: substitute studio host (2013–2016)
Rob Carlin: on-site host for three Sunday afternoon games that NBC aired in February 2018, as they reduced their NHL coverage for that period during the 2018 Winter Olympics
Bill Clement: substitute color commentator (2011–2020); studio host (2006–2007)
Steve Coates: "Inside the Glass" reporter for NBC Sports Philadelphia simulcasts (2011–2014)
Bob Costas: studio host (NHL Winter Classic) (2008-2012)
Bill Cullen: studio co-host (1966 playoffs)
Chris Cuthbert: play-by-play (2006–2007, 2014–2020); formerly play-by-play for TSN Hockey, currently play-by-play for NHL on Sportsnet
John Davidson: lead color commentator (2006)
Win Eliot: lead play-by-play (1966 playoffs)
Cammi Granato: "Inside the Glass" reporter (2006), feature reporter (2007)
Taryn Hatcher: rinkside reporter (2019–2020)
Brett Hull: studio analyst (2007)
Ted Lindsay: lead color commentator (1972–75)
Bill Mazer: lead color commentator (1966 playoffs)
Brian McFarlane: studio host (1972–75)
Mike Milbury: lead studio analyst/"Inside the Glass" reporter (2008–2020), substitute lead color commentator (2017–2020)
Bob Neumeier: Stanley Cup Finals and substitute studio host (2006–2008)
Bill Patrick: substitute studio host (2008; 2011–2013)
Dan Patrick: studio host (2010–2012)
Rick Peckham: occasional play-by-play (2011–2020); also play-by-play for Fox Sports Sun (Tampa Bay Lightning broadcasts)
Drew Remenda: color commentator for NBC Sports California simulcasts (2011–2014)
Jeremy Roenick: studio analyst (2010–2020), lead NHL outdoor games reporter (2014–2019)
Tim Ryan: lead play-by-play (1972–75)
Jim Simpson: studio co-host (1966 playoffs)
Dave Strader: former #2 play-by-play (2006–2007, 2009–2015); part-time (2015–2017); also play-by-play for both TV and radio Dallas Stars broadcasts
Russ Thaler: occasional studio host (2011–2014)
Chris Therien: studio analyst (2011–2020); formerly "Inside the Glass" reporter for NBC Sports Philadelphia (Philadelphia Flyers broadcasts until 2018)

Broadcast teams

1966 Playoffs (broadcast as special extended editions of "NBC Sports In Action") 
Win Eliot-Bill Mazer-Bill Cullen and Jim Simpson

1972–75
 Tim Ryan-Ted Lindsay-Brian McFarlane

For the 1966 playoffs and 1972–75 coverage, play-by-play is listed first, followed by color color commentator, and studio host or hosts. "Inside The Glass" reporters were not utilized by NBC until the 2005–06 season.

2005–06
 Mike Emrick-John Davidson-Pierre McGuire
 Dave Strader-Brian Hayward-Joe Micheletti
 Chris Cuthbert-Peter McNab-Cammi Granato

During its first 2 seasons, NBC used 3 regular broadcast teams for its regional coverage of the NHL. For its first season, they brought in Mike Emrick and John Davidson, the lead broadcast team for NHL on Fox, and added popular is Pierre McGuire was used as "Inside the Glass" reporter (the one who stands between-the-benches).

For both broadcast seasons of the NHL on NBC, the #2 team consisted of Dave Strader, Brian Hayward, and "Inside the Glass" reporter Joe Micheletti.

For the 2005–06 NHL season, the #3 broadcast team was Chris Cuthbert, Peter McNab, and "Inside the Glass" reporter Cammi Granato.

2006–07
 Mike Emrick-Eddie Olczyk-Pierre McGuire
 Dave Strader-Brian Hayward/Peter McNab-Joe Micheletti
 Chris Cuthbert-Peter McNab/Brian Hayward-Darren Pang

For the 2006–07 NHL season, the 2nd season of the NHL on NBC, John Davidson left NBC to become the president of St. Louis Blues, studio analyst Eddie Olczyk was used with Mike Emrick and Pierre McGuire. Furthermore, Darren Pang was used due to Granato's son being born.

During 2006–07, the #2 and #3 broadcast teams were mixed up, due to travel constraints. An example of this is color commentators Peter McNab and Brian Hayward often switching roles during the season and playoffs.

During the season, due to Pierre McGuire's TSN commitments, a variety of "Inside the Glass" reporters have been used with the #1 team, including Joe Micheletti, Cammi Granato, and Peter McNab.

2007–09
Due to NBC's move to flex scheduling & only broadcasting one game a week, Only the team of Emrick, Olczyk, & McGuire is now used.

Also, NBC has scrapped the studio-based intermission show and fired Bill Clement and Ray Ferraro. Pierre McGuire, who continues his role as the "Inside the Glass" reporter, serves as host from the game venue. Former Boston Bruins head coach Mike Milbury is the new analyst. During the Stanley Cup playoffs, NBC Sports reporters like Bob Neumeier and Bill Patrick served as a moderator for Pierre McGuire & Mike Milbury's analysis.

2010–2021
For the 2010 Stanley Cup Finals, Jeremy Roenick returned as a guest analyst for the intermission reports. For Games 5 & 6 on NHL on NBC, Dan Patrick was the studio host. For the 2011 Stanley Cup playoffs, Liam McHugh served as the host while Mike Milbury and Pierre McGuire returned as a analysts for the intermission reports.

In the era after NBC purchased VERSUS and renamed it NBCSN, there was generally a sharing of talent that led to Emrick, Olczyk and McGuire calling the Sunday afternoon Game of the Week but would frequently make use of other NBCSN commentators. Cuthbert and Strader would also return to the network with more games featuring on both NBC and NBCSN, along with John Forslund. Frequently, a mix of Emrick, Albert, Strader, Cuthbert and Forslund would lead NBC's Stanley Cup Playoff crews with analysts Olczyk, McGuire, Joe Micheletti, Brian Engblom and Darren Pang providing analysis. 

In the 2020-21 season, Kenny Albert - who had been calling the conference final that Emrick's crew did not work - replaced the retiring Emrick as the lead voice and called the Stanley Cup Final with Olczyk and Brian Boucher, with McGuire serving as an on-site reporter, making him the only person to contribute to every season NBC carried the league dating back to 2005-06. Emrick would often contribute features. 

Similarly, the studio show was largely a mix of NBCSN's Liam McHugh and Kathryn Tappen with analysts Mike Milbury (until his firing in 2020), Roenick (until his firing in 2020), Keith Jones and later on, Anson Carter and Patrick Sharp. Mike Tirico would occasionally substitute as a host and play-by-play announcer. TSN commentators such as Cuthbert, Gord Miller, Ray Ferraro and Mike Johnson also worked regular season and playoff games.

Towards the end of the NBC era - and with Milbury and Roenick's departures, the retirement of Emrick and the death of play-by-play man Dave Strader - the network began cycling in new talent. Brendan Burke, who would eventually become one of the play-by-play voices of The NHL on TNT and Alex Faust called several playoff games for the network. Recently retired players like Dominic Moore and Ryan Callahan were hired as studio commentators and analysts and AJ Mleczko became the first woman to regularly work for an American national hockey broadcast. Former coach Mike Babcock joined as a studio analyst in the network's last season.

During the COVID-19 pandemic, NBC would often have commentators call games from studios as a safety precaution, with a mix of studio and in-person work during the 2020-21 NHL season and a return to largely full in-person commentary during the postseason. Occasionally, commentators would work multiple games per day from NBC's studios in Connecticut. 

NBCSN broadcast one of the final games before the pandemic suspended the season on March 11, 2020 between the Sharks and Blackhawk, with the network providing updates on how the pandemic was beginning to affect the league. Emrick, Olczyk and Boucher called the game, the last one Emrick would work in person in his career. 

During the NHL's 'bubble' Stanley Cup Playoffs in 2020, Forslund, Gord Miller, Boucher and, until his firing, Mike Milbury worked in the league's Toronto bubble, while Albert and McGuire called games from the Edmonton bubble, with some commentators working from the studio or, in Emrick's case, from home. Emrick would call the last of his record 22 Stanley Cup Finals from a home studio in Michigan, with Olczyk (both Emrick and Olczyk are cancer survivors) in a studio in Connecticut, with Boucher (working his first Stanley Cup Final) and McGuire providing analysis and reporting in Edmonton.

In the final NBC season, Albert and Forslund called the league's two conference finals, with Albert working alongside Olczyk and Boucher and Forslund with Micheletti and McGuire. Burke and Mleckzo and Faust and Moore were the other broadcast teams for the second round with Cuthbert having accepted the job as the voice of Hockey Night in Canada.

Inside the Glass Reporters Used After NBC & Comcast Merger Beginning in 2011
Main commentators for NHL on NBC & NBCSN:
 Pierre McGuire
 Brian Engblom
 Darren Pang
 Joe Micheletti
 Darren Eliot
 Billy Jaffe

2011–2013 on NBC & NBCSN
 Mike Emrick-Eddie Olczyk-Pierre McGuire
 Dave Strader-Brian Engblom
 Kenny Albert-Joe Micheletti
 Gord Miller-Daryl Reaugh-Pierre McGuire
 Rick Peckham-Daryl Reaugh (2012 Stanley Cup playoffs)
 John Forslund-Brian Hayward (2012 Stanley Cup playoffs) or Daryl Reaugh (2013 Stanley Cup playoffs)

2014–15 on NBC & NBCSN
 Mike Emrick-Eddie Olczyk-Pierre McGuire
 Dave Strader-Brian Engblom
 Kenny Albert-Joe Micheletti
 Gord Miller-Ray Ferraro
 Chris Cuthbert-Bret Hedican
 John Forslund-Anson Carter
 Randy Hahn-Jamie Baker-Bret Hedican

Notes

See also
NHL on NBC
List of American Stanley Cup Finals television announcers

NBC
NHL on NBC
NBCSN
NBC commentators